Lost Light is the ninth novel in Michael Connelly's Harry Bosch series.  It is the first Bosch novel to be narrated in first person; all prior Bosch novels had utilized an omniscient third-person style.

Plot summary
Lost Light is the first novel set after Bosch retires from the LAPD at the end of the prior story. Having received his private investigator's license, Bosch investigates an old case concerning the murder of a production assistant on the set of a film.  The case leads him back into contact with his ex-wife Eleanor Wish, who is now a professional poker player in Las Vegas, and Bosch learns at the end that he and Eleanor have a young daughter.

The poem referenced in this work is from Ezra Pound's "Exile's Letter:"

What is the use of talking, and there is no end of talking, 
There is no end of things in the heart.

CD
Lost Light is distinguished by the inclusion of a soundtrack CD, "Dark Sacred Night, the Music of Harry Bosch", to accompany the first hardback edition, featuring jazz music that Harry Bosch would have been listening to, including music of Art Pepper, Sonny Rollins and John Coltrane.

2006 American novels
Harry Bosch series
Little, Brown and Company books
Novels set in Los Angeles